Robert Franklin Foley (born May 30, 1941) is a retired United States Army lieutenant general who served in the Vietnam War. He received the Medal of Honor for leading his unit in an assault on a strong enemy position on November 5, 1966 during Operation Attleboro.

Military career

Foley is a 1963 graduate of the United States Military Academy at West Point and was commissioned an infantry officer. He has held numerous command and staff positions throughout 37 years of active service. He has a Master of Business Administration from Fairleigh Dickinson University.

Foley's command positions include Company A, 2nd Battalion, 27th Infantry Regiment, 25th Infantry Division in South Vietnam and battalion and brigade command with the 3rd Infantry Division in West Germany. He served as chief of staff for the 7th Infantry Division (Light), Fort Ord, California; executive officer to the assistant secretary of the army for manpower and reserve affairs; assistant division commander, 2nd Infantry Division, Commandant of Cadets, United States Military Academy, West Point, New York; deputy commanding general, Second United States Army, Fort Gillem, Georgia; commanding general, United States Army Military District of Washington; and commanding general, Fifth United States Army, Fort Sam Houston, Texas.

Awards and decorations
Foley's awards for peacetime and combat include the Medal of Honor, two Army Distinguished Service Medals, the Defense Superior Service Medal, six Legions of Merit, the Bronze Star Medal, the Purple Heart, five Meritorious Service Medals and the Combat Infantryman's Badge. He was also awarded the Parachutist Badge and the Ranger Tab.

Later life
After his retirement, Foley served as president of Marion Military Institute (MMI) in Marion, Alabama, until his resignation at the end of academic year 2003–2004. During his tenure at MMI, the school saw tremendous growth and recognition in Alabama, and across the United States.  On October 1, 2005 Foley became the eighth director of Army Emergency Relief.

Medal of Honor citation

Captain Foley's Medal of Honor citation reads:

See also

List of Medal of Honor recipients for the Vietnam War

References

1941 births
Living people
United States Army Medal of Honor recipients
Recipients of the Distinguished Service Medal (US Army)
Recipients of the Legion of Merit
Recipients of the Gallantry Cross (Vietnam)
United States Army generals
United States Military Academy alumni
Commandants of the Corps of Cadets of the United States Military Academy
Presidents of Marion Military Institute
United States Army personnel of the Vietnam War
Recipients of the Defense Superior Service Medal
Vietnam War recipients of the Medal of Honor